Berend Hendriks (Apeldoorn, July 9, 1918 – Arnhem, August 6, 1997) was a Dutch artist, and lecturer at the ArtEZ Academy of fine art in Arnhem. Together with Peter Struycken he initiated the Arnhem school of environmental art.

Life and work 
Hendriks, son of an  arborist from Apeldoorn, was initially destined to follow into his father's footsteps. He attended the horticultural school in Boskoop, but finally opted for a career in the visual arts. He continued his studies at the Rijksacademie in Amsterdam, where he studied with Heinrich Campendonk. After graduating he developed into a versatile artist; Painter, glass painting, wall painting, monumental artist, environmental artist, sculptor, ceramist and maker of mosaic. In the 1950s René Karrer worked as assistant to Hendriks.

Hendriks exhibited among others at the Stedelijk Museum in Amsterdam, the Gemeentelijk Van Reekum Museum (now CODA museum) in Apeldoorn and the School of the Arts in Arnhem. At this art school Hendriks was lecturer and stimulated the development of environmental art. Hendriks' work is included in the collection of the CODA museum in Apeldoorn and of the Museum The Pavilions in Almere.

Environmental works of Hendriks can be found in public space in Amersfoort, Gouda and Hengelo. His paintings are characterized by geometric shapes, in which he uses mathematical sequences, both in content and color.

Gallery

See also 
 List of Dutch ceramists

References

External links 

  Berend Hendriks at kunst.rijnstate.nl

1918 births
1997 deaths
Dutch ceramists
Dutch sculptors
Dutch male sculptors
People from Apeldoorn
20th-century ceramists